William Gillett Ritch (May 4, 1830September 14, 1904) was an American public administrator, newspaper publisher, and Republican politician.  He was appointed Secretary of the New Mexico Territory by President Ulysses S. Grant in 1873, and briefly served as acting governor of the New Mexico Territory in the summer of 1875.  Before relocating to New Mexico, he previously served one year in the Wisconsin State Senate, representing Winnebago County.  In historical documents, his name is frequently abbreviated as W. G. Ritch, and his last name is sometimes misspelled as Rich.

Early life and career
Ritch was born on May 4, 1830, in Ulster County, New York.  He became interested in politics and served as county clerk of Ulster County, and clerk of the board of supervisors.

In 1855, he went west, settling first at Hudson, Michigan, and later at Oshkosh, Wisconsin.  In Oshkosh, he served as clerk of the Wisconsin circuit court for Winnebago County from 1861 through 1865.

Civil War service

In early 1865, he volunteered for service in the American Civil War and was enrolled as first lieutenant and adjutant of the 46th Wisconsin Infantry Regiment, under Colonel Frederick S. Lovell.  The 46th Wisconsin Infantry was organized at Camp Randall and mustered into service March 1865. They were assigned to guard railroad and supply lines along the Nashville and Decatur Railroad, and didn't engage in serious fighting.  With the war ended, they were mustered out at Nashville, Tennessee, on September 27, 1865, and returned to Wisconsin.

Wisconsin politics and publishing
Back in Wisconsin, Ritch became active as a supporter of Philetus Sawyer, who was then congressman for Wisconsin's 5th congressional district, which contained Winnebago County.  When Sawyer secured a federal appointment for Winnebago County's state senator, George Gary, Ritch was elected as his successor in an 1867 special election.  Ritch served only one year in the Wisconsin State Senate and did not seek reelection in 1868.  He was, however, chosen as one of Wisconsin's 1868 presidential electors, casting his vote for Ulysses S. Grant.

In 1869, at the urging of Congressman Sawyer, Ritch relocated from Oshkosh to Neenah, Wisconsin, and purchased the Neenah Times newspaper.  Sawyer and Ritch used the newspaper to advocate for the unpopular opinion of establishing a new state hospital for the insane on land near Oshkosh.  The hospital, now known as Winnebago Mental Health Institute, began construction in 1871.

New Mexico

In 1873, Sawyer obtained another federal appointment for Ritch, when President Grant appointed him Secretary of the New Mexico Territory.  Ritch ultimately served thirteen years as Secretary of the Territory, and served several weeks as acting governor in 1875 following the death of Marsh Giddings.  While acting governor, he encountered some controversy over his initial refusal to pay off the bounty hunter who shot down Billy the Kid, a decision that was eventually reversed.  As Secretary, he contributed to the design of what would later become the Seal of New Mexico, and was an advocate for establishing a non-sectarian education system in the territory.  He was also the first president of the New Mexico Historical Society, president of the territory's Bureau of Immigration, and the Educational Association of New Mexico.

After retiring from public office, he continued to reside at Engle, New Mexico, and became a cattle ranch operator.

Personal life and family
Ritch and his wife, Olive, had at least three children.

Ritch died at his home in Engle on September 14, 1904.  Then-governor Miguel Antonio Otero issued a proclamation honoring Ritch, ordering flags to be flown at half-staff, and announcing that Ritch would lie in state at the territorial capital.  He was buried with military honors at Santa Fe National Cemetery, in a ceremony organized by his comrades in the Independent Order of Odd Fellows.  He was a prominent member of the Odd Fellows in New Mexico, and served a term as Grand Master of the state organization; he was also a member of the Knights Templar.

References

External links
 
 

People from Ulster County, New York
Governors of New Mexico Territory
Republican Party Wisconsin state senators
New Mexico Republicans
People of Wisconsin in the American Civil War
Union Army officers
1830 births
1904 deaths
19th-century American politicians
Burials at Santa Fe National Cemetery